Anthony Blue is a former Canadian Football League defensive back.

Graduating from UNLV, Blue played 14 games with the Las Vegas Posse in 1994, making 23 tackles and returning 1 punt.

References

UNLV Rebels football players
Las Vegas Posse players
1964 births
Living people
Seattle Seahawks players
National Football League replacement players